Adam Smith is a 1972 British series. Most episodes were written by Trevor Griffiths. The lead character was supposedly inspired by Denis Forman.

Plot
A Scots minister, following his wife's death, questions the purpose of his local ministry but finds it in his spiritual work for the community.

Cast
Andrew Keir
Brigit Forsyth
Janet Munro
Tom Conti
Kara Wilson
Janet Munro
David Langton
Maggie Jordan
John Young

References

External links

1972 British television series debuts